New Palace can refer to:

 The former name of Topkapı Palace in Istanbul after its completion (in Turkish: Yeni Sarayı)
 New Palace, Potsdam (in German: Neues Palais)
 New Palace, Stuttgart (German: Neues Schloss)
 New Palace, Murshidabad in West Bengal, India
 New Palace, another name for Shree Chhatrapati Shahu Museum, Kolhapur, India
one of the buildings in the Lazzaretto of Manoel Island, Gżira, Malta